Coquimatlán is a city and seat of the municipality of Coquimatlán, in the Mexican state of Colima. As of 2005, it had a population of 11,374.

Climate

References

Populated places in Colima